The Cabinet Secretary for Economy, Jobs and Fair Work was a position in the Scottish cabinet until June 2018. The Cabinet Secretary had responsibilities for the Scottish economy, infrastructure, trade and investment, business, industry, employment, trade unions and energy. The Cabinet Secretary was assisted by the Minister for Business, Innovation and Energy and the Minister for Employability and Training. The post was abolished in June 2018, with the "economy" part of the brief moving to the Cabinet Secretary for Finance, Economy and Fair Work and the infrastructure responsibilities moving to the Cabinet Secretary for Transport, Infrastructure and Connectivity.

The only Cabinet Secretary for Economy, Jobs and Fair Work was Keith Brown, who was appointed in May 2016.

In February 2020 a Cabinet Secretary for Economy, Fair Work and Culture was appointed, taking over many of the responsibilities of the former portfolio, which were thus again held separately from the Finance brief.

Overview

Responsibilities
The responsibilities of the Cabinet Secretary for Economy, Jobs and Fair Work included:
 the Scottish economy, 
 infrastructure and investment policy
 Scottish Enterprise
 trade and inward investment
 innovation
 internationalisation
 productivity
 fair work and inclusive growth
 labour market strategy
 living wage
 European structural funds
 consumer advocacy and advice
 employment policy
 trade unions
 bankruptcy policy
 business, industry and manufacturing
 cities
 energy
 life sciences
 financial services
 low-carbon economy
 renewable energy industries
 youth and women's employment
 employability programmes

Public bodies
The following public bodies reported to the Cabinet Secretary for Economy, Jobs and Fair Work:
 Accountant in Bankruptcy
 Scottish Enterprise

List of office holders

References

External links
The Scottish Cabinet

Economy, Jobs and Fair Work
2016 establishments in Scotland